Peter Goodwill Hamilton (July 20, 1942 – March 21, 2017) was an American professional stock car racing driver. He competed in NASCAR for six years, where he won four times in his career (including the 1970 Daytona 500), three times driving for Petty Enterprises.

Racing career

Hamilton began racing in the street division in 1962 at Norwood Arena Speedway in Massachusetts, where he quickly earned the nickname "The Dedham Flash". In 1965, he was the Thompson World Series Twin 50s champion. He won the 1967 NASCAR national Sportsman division championship.

After that season he moved south to race in NASCAR. He started racing in the NASCAR Grand National division in 1968, and was the series Rookie of the Year. In 1969, he competed in NASCAR's Grand American division, a division of smaller pony cars. He won 12 of 26 races that year.

He had 3 wins in 1970 for Petty Enterprises in the No. 40 Plymouth Superbird with Maurice Petty as his crew-chief. He won the 1970 Daytona 500 and both races at Talladega Superspeedway. Hamilton won his Twin 125 mile qualifying race for the 1971 Daytona 500 driving Cotton Owens' No. 6 Plymouth, finishing the season with one pole and 11 top five finishes.  He retired from full-time NASCAR racing after 1973 because of complications from a neck injury in a 1969 Grand American race.

Hamilton continued to compete in short track races, and won the 1974 Snowball Derby in his late model racecar.

Car builder 
Pete helped Chrysler's Larry Rathgeb develop their "Kit-Car", a weld-it-yourself Volare or Aspen late model stock car that any racer could order from Plymouth and Dodge dealers.  He moved to Norcross, Georgia, and worked as a car builder and mentor to many drivers on the 1980s southern dirt tracks, launching successful racing careers for Marvin Oliver and James Shepherd.

Career award
He was inducted into the New England Auto Racers Hall of Fame in 1998 in its inaugural class.
Pete was named to the Georgia Racing Hall of Fame in 2012.

Personal life
Hamilton was born outside Boston in Dedham, and raised in nearby Newton, Massachusetts. He was the son of Roger S. Hamilton, once the Dean of Northeastern University. He graduated from Newton High School in 1960. He married his wife, Susan 
Huckstorf in 1970. After racing, he owned a warehouse in Atlanta. He spent his time between Duluth, Georgia and Acton, Maine.

Death
Hamilton died on March 21, 2017, at the age of 74 due to complications of a stroke. He was buried at Peachtree Memorial Park in Norcross, Georgia. He was survived by his wife of forty-seven years and a daughter.

Motorsports career results

NASCAR
(key) (Bold – Pole position awarded by qualifying time. Italics – Pole position earned by points standings or practice time. * – Most laps led.)

Grand National Series

Winston Cup Series

Daytona 500

References

External links
 
"2 Minutes With..." Interview video

1942 births
2017 deaths
People from Dedham, Massachusetts
Racing drivers from Boston
Racing drivers from Massachusetts
NASCAR drivers
American Speed Association drivers
Newton North High School alumni